Chung Nam Group is a Hong Kong-based watch and clock movement manufacturer. The Chung Nam Group comprises Isa Prestige Time, Roamer, and Isa. It has plants based in China, Hong Kong, and Switzerland. Isa movements are used in mid-line watches.

In recent years, Chung Nam Corporation has expanded into a global corporation of technology, manufacturing, and retailing. Chung Nam Group has a long history and has grown into one of China's leading Companies.  Its business now includes CN Watch, CN Innovations, CN Convergence, CN Fashion, CN Lifestyle, and CN Creations.

History
The Chung Nam Group of Companies is based in Hong Kong, tracing its origin back over 70 years. The late Mr. and Mrs. Chong Ching Um founded the group in 1935, engaging in export, manufacturing, and trading in the Southeast Asian markets.

During the 1980s, China’s open door policy enabled the group to concentrate more on manufacturing and embark on the development of precision engineering. During the 1990s, to maintain a leading position in manufacturing, the group began investing in technology and hardware for critical processes. Towards 2000, in-house research and development resulted in a breakthrough with different patents being filed. The group gradually became diversified through acquisitions and establishing new joint ventures.

The group is headquartered in Hong Kong and employs over 100,000 people all over the world. Its managing director is Bob Chong. The group has a focused structure operating with two platforms: (1) technology and manufacturing, and (2) distribution and retailing.

Milestones

 1935–40 Watch manufacturing and distribution
 1950s Retail and wholesaling for watch / OCTO watches
 1960s Retailing and distribution of bedding, houseware, and shoes
 1980s Precision engineering / Fashion retailing and wholesaling
 1991–92 Physical vapour deposition and metal injection molding / Thin-film coating
 1997 Radio frequency
 2000 In-house research and development
 2002 Optical coating
 2003 Wireless networking environment / Mobile handheld devices, wrist instruments / Patent for hard coating stainless steel
 2005 RFID development / Establish Chun Nam Corporation as the holding company for the six major businesses
 2006 Three private equity fund investments in CN Innovations Holdings Ltd
 2007 Production of TV, film, and animation content for worldwide broadcast markets
 2008 Establish an independent business unit for corporate social responsibility

References

External links
 Chung Nam

Manufacturing companies of Hong Kong
Watchmaking conglomerates
Companies with year of establishment missing
Watch manufacturing companies of China